Marc Kennedy (born February 5, 1982) is a Canadian curler, and Vancouver 2010 Winter Olympic gold medallist from St. Albert, Alberta.

In 2019, Kennedy was named the greatest Canadian male second in history in a TSN poll of broadcasters, reporters and top curlers.

Career
Kennedy was born in St. Albert, Alberta, the son of Don and Connie. He started curling at age six.  He is a Canadian Winter Games champion and three-time provincial junior champion. He won his first provincial men's championship with Kevin Martin in 2007.  As a junior, he played second for Carter Rycroft at the 1998 Canadian Junior Curling Championships and played third for Jeff Erickson at the 1999 and 2001 Canadian Juniors.

In 2003 Kennedy was an alternate for the 2003 Winter Universiade gold medal-winning team from Brandon University skipped by Mike McEwen.

After 2-time World Junior Champion John Morris moved to Alberta in 2003, Kennedy joined his team at second position. In 2004, they lost the Canada Cup final to Randy Ferbey.

In 2006, both Morris and Kennedy joined 2-time Brier champion Kevin Martin on his new team.

In 2008, Kennedy won the Brier and the World Championships as a member of the team.  They repeated their Brier win in 2009, going undefeated for a second straight year and setting a record for consecutive Brier games won (26) previously held by the Ferbey foursome.

In 2010, Kennedy won an Olympic Gold Medal in Vancouver with Kevin Martin, John Morris and Ben Hebert as Team Canada defeated Thomas Ulsrud of Norway 6-3 in the Gold Medal Game.

After a win at the Alberta provincials, Kennedy headed with Team Martin to the 2011 Tim Hortons Brier. They went through the round robin with a 9-2 win–loss record and lost the page 3 vs. 4 playoff game to Ontario and the bronze medal game to Newfoundland/Labrador. Kennedy left the Brier before the bronze medal game because he and his wife were expecting a new child.

In 2013, Kennedy and Team Martin won the Alberta provincials with a close win over Kevin Koe to earn a berth in the 2013 Tim Hortons Brier in their hometown Edmonton. On the first day, Kennedy won the Ford Hot Shots skills and shot-making competition that preceded the start of round-robin play. The team played in the 2013 Canadian Olympic Curling Trials, finishing third.

Following Kevin Martin's retirement from curling in 2014, Kennedy joined Team Kevin Koe at third. They played in their first Brier together in 2015, finishing with a 6-5 record, missing the playoffs. In December 2015, Kennedy, along with his teammates, claimed the first berth in the 2017 Canadian Olympic Curling Trials with their Canada Cup victory in Grande Prairie, AB. The team continued their winning ways that season by winning the 2016 Tim Hortons Brier and a gold medal at the 2016 World Men's Curling Championship. Representing Team Canada as defending champions, the team lost in the final of the 2017 Tim Hortons Brier.

The team would go on to win the 2017 Olympic Trials and represented Canada at the 2018 Winter Olympics, finishing fourth.

Following the 2017-18 season, Kennedy announced he would take a break from competitive curling to heal injuries and focus on family.  He subsequently took a position as national team program performance consultant with Curling Canada. He was invited to play third for team Brad Jacobs at the 2018 Canada Cup, to fill in for Ryan Fry, who took a couple of events off, following unsportsmanlike behaviour from an event he played in. Kennedy's addition to the team worked out, and they would win the event. Kennedy announced in March 2019 that he would join Team Jacobs to replace Ryan Fry for the next three curling seasons. 
 In their first event, the 2019 AMJ Campbell Shorty Jenkins Classic, the team went undefeated up until the final where they would lose to Team Epping. Team Jacobs won three straight Grand Slam events at the Tour Challenge, National and the Canadian Open. They would unsurprisingly win the 2020 Northern Ontario Men's Provincial Curling Championship, going in as the number one seed. At the 2020 Tim Hortons Brier, they battled through two tiebreakers before losing to Newfoundland and Labrador's Brad Gushue in the 3 vs. 4 game, all within the same day. It would be the team's last event of the season as both the Players' Championship and the Champions Cup Grand Slam events were cancelled due to the COVID-19 pandemic.

Team Jacobs played in two tour events during the 2020–21 season, winning the Stu Sells Oakville Tankard and losing in the qualification game of the Ashley HomeStore Curling Classic. Due to the COVID-19 pandemic in Ontario, the 2021 provincial championship was cancelled. As the reigning provincial champions, Team Jacobs was chosen to represent Northern Ontario at the 2021 Tim Hortons Brier. At the Brier, they finished with a 7–5 record. Also during the 2020–21 season, Kennedy served as the alternate for the Brendan Bottcher rink at the 2021 World Men's Curling Championship. He was added to the team as a backup plan in case Bottcher's third Darren Moulding's back injury that he sustained during the 2021 Canadian Mixed Doubles Curling Championship re-emerged as an issue. Kennedy, however, did not have to play in any games for the team as Moulding's back held up for the tournament.

Kennedy was named to a third Olympic team as the alternate for the Brad Gushue rink for the Beijing 2022 Olympics.

2022 Winter Olympics
Kennedy's team, skipped by Brad Gushue, qualified as the Canadian representatives by winning the 2021 Canadian Olympic Curling Trials, defeating Brad Jacobs 4–3 in the final. Kennedy was the alternate for the team. The team would go onto win the bronze medal.

Personal life
Kennedy is married to his wife, Nicole Kennedy (née MacDonald), and they have two daughters. His brother Glen is also a curler.

Kennedy has a marketing degree from the University of Alberta. He was a franchise owner for M&M Meat Shops until he sold his business in 2012 to focus more on curling. He also worked as a real estate agent for Sarasota Realty. Kennedy currently works as a coaching consultant.

Kennedy is a Hec Gervais Scholarship winner, as well as a Can Fund recipient He is also currently an MBA Student at the University of Alberta.

Marc and Nicole began a youth bonspiel in 2016 called the Marc Kennedy Junior Classic, held in St. Albert and Edmonton. The Bonspiel saw a spin-off program in 2018 (Over The Pond) introducing international teams selected through the Nordic Jr Curling Tour. Two Canadian teams are also selected and visit the year-end event in Sweden.

In his youth, Kennedy also played Canadian football and played for the Edmonton Huskies.

Teams

Awards & recognitions
 Canadian Curling Championship First Team All Star (Second) 2007
 Canadian Curling Championship First Team All Star (Second) 2008
 World Curling Tour MVP 2008
 Canadian Curling Championship First Team All Star (Second) 2009
 University Of Alberta Award of Excellence 2010
 Canadian Curling Championship First Team All Star (Second) 2011
 Canadian Curling Championship Second Team All Star (Second) 2013
 Canadian Curling Championship Second Team All Star (Second) 2015
 TSN Top Male Second Of All Time 2019
 TSN #8 Top Male Player Of All Time 2019

See also

List of Canadian sports personalities

References

External links

1982 births
Living people
Curlers from Edmonton
Sportspeople from St. Albert, Alberta
World curling champions
Brier champions
Curlers at the 2010 Winter Olympics
Curlers at the 2022 Winter Olympics
Olympic curlers of Canada
Olympic gold medalists for Canada
Olympic bronze medalists for Canada
Olympic medalists in curling
Medalists at the 2010 Winter Olympics
Medalists at the 2022 Winter Olympics
Canadian male curlers
Continental Cup of Curling participants
Universiade medalists in curling
Curlers at the 2018 Winter Olympics
Universiade gold medalists for Canada
Medalists at the 2003 Winter Universiade
Canada Cup (curling) participants
University of Alberta alumni
Players of Canadian football from Alberta